Porina duduana is a species of foliicolous lichen belonging to the family Porinaceae. It was discovered in Yangambi, in the Democratic Republic of the Congo on the leaves of Scaphopetalum thonneri and subsequently described as new to science in 2014. It resembles Porina rufula in appearance but differs in the arrangement of photobiont cells and in having smaller perithecia and smaller ascospores.

References

Gyalectales
Lichen species
Lichens of the Democratic Republic of the Congo
Lichens described in 2014
Taxa named by Robert Lücking